Akheem Mesidor is a Canadian-born  college football defensive lineman for the Miami Hurricanes. He previously played at West Virginia.

Early life and high school
Mesidor grew up Ottawa, Ontario, and began playing gridiron football with the North Gloucester Giants of the National Capital Amateur Football Association. He attended several high schools in the Ottawa area and Royal Imperial Collegiate of Canada in St. Catharines. Mesidor transferred to Clearwater Academy International in Clearwater, Florida before his senior year. Mesidor was rated a three-star recruit and committed to play college football at West Virginia over offers from UCLA, Georgia Tech, Syracuse, and Pittsburgh.

College career
Mesidor began his college career at West Virginia. He played both defensive end and defensive tackle during his true freshman season and was named second team All-Big 12 Conference after recording 32 tackles, 6.5 tackles for loss, and five sacks. Mesidor moved nose tackle entering his second season. He finished the season with 38 tackles, eight tackles for loss, and 4.5 sacks. After the season, Mesidor entered the NCAA transfer portal.

Mesidor ultimately transferred to Miami over offers from USC, Auburn, and Tennessee. He was named a starter on the Hurricanes' defensive line despite not participating in the team's spring practices.

References

External links
West Virginia Mountaineers bio
Miami Hurricanes bio

Living people
Canadian players of American football
American football defensive linemen
Miami Hurricanes football players
Sportspeople from Ottawa
West Virginia Mountaineers football players
Year of birth missing (living people)